Kossaki  is a village in the administrative district of Gmina Kolno, within Kolno County, Podlaskie Voivodeship, in north-eastern Poland.

The village has a population of 120.

References

Kossaki